Radiooooo.com is a French music website, based in Paris.

History
Radiooooo was founded in 2013 by DJ Benjamin Moreau. On Radiooooo, users can peruse playlists arranged not by genre but by decade and region. Each of the five Os in the name is meant to stand in for one of the world's five continents.

It is available as an app. The website has been reviewed by The New Yorker.

References

French music websites
French companies established in 2013
Companies based in Paris
Mass media companies of France